Cortez Belle (born 27 August 1983) is a former English footballer who played as a either defender or a striker. Belle played in the Football League for Chester City.

Career
Belle played in the Football League for Chester City during the 2004–05 season, having signed in January 2004. He was red carded three times between September and January and only made one first-team appearance after this.

In January 2008, Belle signed for Northwich Victoria but left the club later that year to sign for Chippenham Town who made Belle their record signing. Belle only spent a short time at Chippenham though after his contract was terminated due to breach of conduct in December 2008. However the club still hold his registration meaning he cannot play for another English club without them compensating Chippenham.

In August 2011 he moved to Port Talbot Town. In June 2013 he moved to Carmarthen Town

In August 2016 he moved to St Julians, having signed for Taff's Well earlier than summer.

In July 2017 he returned to Port Talbot Town before again playing for Taff's Well in 2018. In October 2018 he moved on to Goytre United.

Coaching career
In January 2018, Belle was appointed player-manager at Port Talbot Town.

Personal life
In June 2017, Belle received a 12-month suspended prison sentence after stealing £15,000 from his employers Fitzalan High School where he was working as a staff absence and data manager. It was told in court that Belle stole the money to pay off his gambling debts.

On January 4, 2022, Belle was sentenced to eight weeks in prison for severe animal neglect. He was also banned from keeping animals for life.

References

External links

1983 births
Living people
Footballers from Coventry
English footballers
Association football defenders
Merthyr Tydfil F.C. players
Chester City F.C. players
Newport County A.F.C. players
Llanelli Town A.F.C. players
Halifax Town A.F.C. players
Northwich Victoria F.C. players
Chippenham Town F.C. players
Port Talbot Town F.C. players
Carmarthen Town A.F.C. players
Connah's Quay Nomads F.C. players
English Football League players
National League (English football) players
Cymru Premier players
Sportspeople convicted of crimes
English prisoners and detainees
Prisoners and detainees of England and Wales
Taff's Well A.F.C. players
Goytre United F.C. players
People convicted of cruelty to animals
People convicted of theft